This article lists important figures and events in the public affairs of British Malaya during the year 1933, together with births and deaths of prominent Malayans.

Incumbent political figures

Central level 
 Governor of Federated of Malay States :
 Cecil Clementi 
 Chief Secretaries to the Government of the FMS :
 Andrew Caldecott 
 Governor of Straits Settlements : 
 Cecil Clementi

State level 
  Perlis :
 Raja of Perlis : Syed Alwi Syed Saffi Jamalullail
  Johore :
 Sultan of Johor : Sultan Ibrahim Al-Masyhur
  Kedah :
 Sultan of Kedah : Abdul Hamid Halim Shah
  Kelantan :
 Sultan of Kelantan : Sultan Ismail Sultan Muhammad IV
  Trengganu :
 Sultan of Trengganu : Sulaiman Badrul Alam Shah
  Selangor :
 British Residents of Selangor : 
 G. E. Cater (until unknown date)
 George Ernest London (from unknown date)
 Sultan of Selangor : Sultan Sir Alaeddin Sulaiman Shah
  Penang :
 Monarchs : King George V 
 Residents-Councillors :
 Percy Tothill Allen (until unknown date)
Arthur Mitchell Goodman (from unknown date)
  Malacca :
 Monarchs : King George V 
 Residents-Councillors :
  Negri Sembilan :
 British Residents of Negri Sembilan : John Whitehouse Ward Hughes
 Yang di-Pertuan Besar of Negri Sembilan : 
 Tuanku Muhammad Shah ibni Almarhum Tuanku Antah (until unknown date)
 Tuanku Abdul Rahman ibni Almarhum Tuanku Muhammad (from unknown date)
   Pahang :
 British Residents of Pahang : Hugh Goodwin Russell Leonard
 Sultan of Pahang : Sultan Abu Bakar
  Perak :
 British Residents of Perak : G. E. Cater
 Sultan of Perak : Sultan Iskandar Shah

Events 
 23 January – Federal Council of Federated Malay States passed the Malay Regiment Bill to later establish the Experimental Malay Company, Malaysian Army.
 1 March – The recruitment of 25 males for the First Experimental Malay Company after the passage of Malay Regiment Bill.
 Unknown date – Alwi Mosque was completed and opened by Raja Syed Alwi.
 Unknown date – Football Association of Malaya (FAM) was established, formed from Malayan Football Association (MFA).
 Unknown date – Construction started on Istana Bukit Serene.
 Unknown date – Kulim Rubber Plantations Ltd was incorporated.

Births
 6 April – Ahmad Nawab – Musician
 11 June – Rahah Mohamed Noah – Wife to former 2nd Prime Minister, Tun Abdul Razak
 Unknown date – Ali Fiji – Actor (died 1996)
 Unknown date – Hamid Gurkha – Actor
 Unknown date – HM Busra – Actor (died 1981)
 Unknown date – Ismail Hashim – Academician (died 1996)
 Unknown date – Mariam Ismail – Actress (died 2015)
 Unknown date – Shahnon Ahmad – Politician

Deaths 
 10 April – Raja Chulan – Raja Di-Hilir of Perak 
 1 August - Tuanku Muhammad Shah ibni Tuanku Antah – 7th Yang di-Pertuan Besar of Negeri Sembilan
 Unknown date – Mohammad Eunos Abdullah - Nationalist

See also
 1933
 1932 in Malaya
 1934 in Malaya
 History of Malaysia

References

1930s in British Malaya
Malaya